Kate Biscoe is an American make-up artist. She won an Academy Award in the category Best Makeup and Hairstyling for the film Vice.

Selected filmography 
 Vice (2018; co-won with Greg Cannom and Patricia Dehaney)

References

External links 

Living people
Year of birth missing (living people)
Place of birth missing (living people)
American make-up artists
Best Makeup Academy Award winners